Rhosnesni High School, also known as Ysgol Rhosnesni High School or simply Ysgol Rhosnesni, is an English-medium mixed comprehensive secondary school in Rhosnesni, Wrexham, Wales. It was created in 2003 and maintained by Wrexham County Borough Council as a part of their controversial "super schools" plan.

History 

In 2002, plans were ratified by the Welsh Assembly to create two 'super' schools in Wrexham, with an emphasis on vocational education. Opposition to the plans was received from parents, and a petition of over 1000 signatures was delivered to the Wrexham County Council in April 2002. Nearby Yale College, which was to offset the some costs of the project by buying the Groves school and selling land, dropped out.

By late 2003 it became apparent that the original £12 million budget for upgrades would fall short by about £10 million because inflation was not accounted for in estimates. Nonetheless, the county council approved overspends allowing the schools to be upgraded as planned. Both of the new schools serve around 2500 pupils age 11 through to 16.

Three secondary schools were merged into two schools: Rhosnesni (formerly known as St. David's School), and Ysgol Clywedog (formerly known as Bryn Offa). The third school, Groves, was used as a temporary site for Rhosnesni, Ysgol Clywedog and another local school, St Joseph's Catholic High School, while improvements were made to their permanent sites. The Groves was shut down entirely in 2006 and remained unused until its partial demolition in 2013/'14. As of 2022, the oldest part of the Groves school building still stands, and proposals for demolishing the site faced local opposition.

In 2014, a report by Wrexham Council showed that there had been a big fall in admissions to Wrexham's super schools. The percentage of primary school pupils applying to Rhosnesni had fallen from 71% to 36%. Rhosnesni was one of 40 Welsh schools that was chosen to take part in a Welsh government scheme to improve standards.

In 2022, after Estyn’s inspection of the school in June 2022 they decided that the school made insufficient progress from their last core inspection in 2018. This led to Rhosnesni High entering special measures. 

Here's an extract from the Estyn report 

" In lessons, around half of pupils are making suitable progress in their knowledge,

understanding and skills. They demonstrate some basic recall of their prior learning,for example events in a novel or key subject vocabulary. However, a similarproportion of pupils are making only limited progress. Generally, this is the result ofteaching that does not challenge them sufficiently, as well the lack of a co-ordinated,strategic approach to the progressive development of pupils’ skills.A few pupils contribute to discussion activities enthusiastically, and a very fewexplain their ideas fluently and articulately. The majority listen carefully to theirteachers and peers and participate suitably in pair and group work. These pupils usebasic subject terminology appropriately. However, many pupils use a narrowvocabulary, which limits their expression. This is often because teachers do notencourage them to develop their answers. A minority are either reluctant or unable toparticipate, or struggle to express themselves beyond very basic responses."

Location 

Previously St Davids High School (Ysgol Dewi Sant), Rhosnesni High School is situated on Rhosnesni Lane in the city of Wrexham, North Wales.  It opened in 2003 at a temporary site on Pen-y-Maes Avenue and later moving to its current site after the school buildings were updated and opened in September 2004, although an official opening ceremony was not conducted until April 2005. Students from the former schools were asked to create the logo and uniform which consists of a Royal blue blazer, optional black V neck pullover, white shirt, black tailored trousers or knee length A line skirt, knee length black socks or black tights, black formal shoes with a blue and yellow diagonally striped tie.   The logo is a shield divided into quarters on the diagonal with the letters YRHS (an abbreviation of Ysgol Rhosnesni High School). The students also created a new motto, "Respect, Honesty, Success" which cleverly shares the school's initials. 
As of September 2018 the headteacher Mr Brant is expecting to raise the schools reputation, performance and standards following an end of year newsletter referencing violations in dress code and behavioural expectations will no longer be ignored. 
True to his word in excess of 90 students were either sent home or detained in the hall for the duration of the first day with issues such as incorrect footwear and inappropriate skirts being the main issue.  This proved controversial with some parents taking to social media to vent fury while many others welcomed the tough approach while giving their backing to the new regime as a long time due.

References

Further reading 
New headmaster new approach letter retrieved September 2018
https://www.rhosnesni-high.wrexham.sch.uk/pdf/prospectus.pdf retrieved September 2018
https://www.chesterchronicle.co.uk/news/local-news/super-school-praised-first-class-5284487 retrieved September 2018

External links 
Official site of school

Secondary schools in Wrexham County Borough